Czech orthography is a system of rules for proper formal writing (orthography) in Czech. The earliest form of separate Latin script specifically designed to suit Czech was devised by Czech theologian and church reformist Jan Hus, the namesake of the Hussite movement, in one of his seminal works, De orthographia bohemica (On Bohemian orthography).

The modern Czech orthographic system is diacritic, having evolved from an earlier system which used many digraphs (although one digraph has been kept - ch). The caron is added to standard Latin letters to express sounds which are foreign to Latin. The acute accent is used for long vowels.

The Czech orthography is considered the model for many other Balto-Slavic languages using the Latin alphabet; Slovak orthography being its direct revised descendant, while the Serbo-Croatian Gaj's Latin alphabet and its Slovene descendant system are largely based on it. All of them make use of similar diacritics and also have a similar, usually interchangeable, relationship between the letters and the sounds they are meant to represent.

Alphabet 
The Czech alphabet consists of 42 letters.

The letters Q, W, and X are used exclusively in foreign words, and the former two are replaced with KV and V once the word becomes “naturalized” (assimilated into Czech); the digraphs dz and dž are also used mostly for foreign words and are not considered to be distinct letters in the Czech alphabet.

Orthographic principles
Czech orthography is primarily phonemic (rather than phonetic) because an individual grapheme usually corresponds to an individual phoneme (rather than a sound). However, some graphemes and letter groups are remnants of historical phonemes which were used in the past but have since merged with other phonemes. Some changes in the phonology have not been reflected in the orthography.

Voicing assimilation

All the obstruent consonants are subject to voicing (before voiced obstruents except ) or devoicing (before voiceless consonants and at the end of words); spelling in these cases is morphophonemic (i.e. the morpheme has the same spelling as before a vowel). Devoicing  changes its articulation place: it becomes . After unvoiced consonants  is devoiced: for instance, in  'three', which is pronounced . Written voiced or voiceless counterparts are kept according to the etymology of the word, e.g. odpadnout  (to fall away) - od- is a prefix; written  is devoiced here because of the following voiceless .

For historical reasons, the consonant  is written k in Czech words like kde ('where', < Proto-Slavic *kъdě) or kdo ('who', < Proto-Slavic *kъto). This is because the letter g was historically used for the consonant . The original Slavic phoneme  changed into  in the Old-Czech period. Thus,  is not a separate phoneme (with a corresponding grapheme) in words of domestic origin; it occurs only in foreign words (e.g. graf, gram, etc.).

Final devoicing
Unlike in English but like German and Russian, voiced consonants are pronounced voicelessly in the final position in words. In declension, they are voiced in cases where the words take on endings.

Compare:
 led  – ledy  (ice – ices)
 let  – lety  (flight – flights)

"Soft" I and "hard" Y
However, in the 14th century, this difference in standard pronunciation disappeared, though it has been preserved in some Moravian dialects. In words of native origin "soft"  and  cannot follow "hard" consonants, while "hard"  and  cannot follow "soft" consonants; "neutral" consonants can be followed by either vowel:

In words of foreign origin,  are pronounced ; that is, as if they were written , e.g. in diktát, dictation.

Historically the letter  was hard, but this changed in the 19th century. However, in some words it is still followed by the letter : tác (plate) – tácy (plates).

At school pupils must memorize word roots and prefixes where  is written;  is written in other cases.

Letter Ě 
The letter  is a vestige of Old Czech palatalization.
  are usually written  instead of 
 In words like vjezd (entry, drive-in) objem (volume),  are written because in such cases –je- is etymologically preceded by the prefixes v- or ob-
 The first-person singular pronouns mě (for the genitive and accusative cases) and mně (for the dative and locative) are homophones —see Czech declension

Letter Ů 

Historically, long  changed into the diphthong   (as also happened in the English Great Vowel Shift with words such as "house"), though not in word-initial position in the prestige form.  In 1848  at the beginning of word-roots was changed into  in words like  to reflect this. Thus, the letter  is written at the beginning of word-roots only: úhel (angle), trojúhelník (triangle), except in loanwords: skútr (scooter).

Meanwhile, historical long   changed into the diphthong  .  As was common with scribal abbreviations, the letter  in the diphthong was sometimes written as a ring above the letter , producing , e.g. kóň > kuoň > kůň (horse), like the origin of the German umlaut. Later, the pronunciation changed into , but the grapheme  has remained. It never occurs at the beginning of words: dům (house), domů (home, homeward).

The letter  now has the same pronunciation as the letter  (long ), but alternates with a short  when a word is inflected (e.g. nom. kůň → gen. koně, nom. dům → gen. domu), thus showing the historical evolution of the language.

Agreement between the subject and the predicate

The predicate must be always in accordance with the subject in the sentence - in number and person (personal pronouns), and with past and passive participles also in gender. This grammatical principle affects the orthography (see also "Soft" I and "Hard" Y) – it is especially important for the correct choice and writing of plural endings of the participles.

Examples:

The mentioned example shows both past (byl, byla ...) and passive (koupen, koupena ...) participles. The accordance in gender takes effect in the past tense and the passive voice, not in the present and future tenses in active voice.

If the complex subject is a combination of nouns of different genders, masculine animate gender is prior to others and the masculine inanimate and feminine genders are prior to the neuter gender.

Examples:
muži a ženy byli - men and women were
kočky a koťata byly - cats and kittens were
my jsme byli (my = we all/men) vs. my jsme byly (my = we women) - we were

Priority of genders:
masculine animate > masculine inanimate & feminine > neuter

Punctuation

The use of the full stop (.), the colon, the semicolon, the question mark (?) and the exclamation mark (!) is similar to their use in other European languages. The full stop is placed after a number if it stands for ordinal numerals (as in German), e.g. 1. den (= první den) – the 1st day.

The comma is used to separate individual parts in complex-compound sentences, lists, isolated parts of sentences, etc. Its use in Czech is different from English. Subordinate (dependent) clauses must be always separated from their principal (independent) clauses, for instance. A comma is not placed before a (and), i (as well as), ani (nor) and nebo (or) when they connect parts of sentences or clauses in copulative conjunctions (on a same level). It must be placed in non-copulative conjunctions (consequence, emphasis, exclusion, etc.). A comma can, however, occur in front of the word a (and) if the former is part of comma-delimited parenthesis: Jakub, můj mladší bratr, a jeho učitel Filip byli příliš zabráni do rozhovoru. Probírali látku, která bude u zkoušky, a též, kdo na ní bude. A comma also separates subordinate conjunctions introduced by composite conjunctions a proto (and therefore) and a tak (and so).

Examples:
 otec a matka – father and mother, otec nebo matka – father or mother (coordinate relation – no commas)
 Je to pravda, nebo ne? – Is it true, or not? (exclusion)
 Pršelo, a proto nikdo nepřišel. – It was raining, and this is why nobody came. (consequence)
 Já vím, kdo to je. – I know who it is. Myslím, že se mýlíš. – I think (that) you are wrong. (subordinate relation)
 Jak se máš, Anno? – How are you, Anna? (addressing a person)
 Karel IV., římský císař a český král, založil hrad Karlštejn. – Charles IV, Holy Roman Emperor and Bohemian king, founded the Karlštejn Castle. (comma-delimited parenthesis)

Quotation marks. The first one preceding the quoted text is placed to the bottom line:
 Petr řekl: „Přijdu zítra.“ – Peter said: "I'll come tomorrow."

Other types of quotation marks: ‚‘ »«

Apostrophes are used rarely in Czech. They can denote a missing sound in non-standard speech, but it is optional, e.g. řek''' or řek (= řekl, he said).

Capital letters

The first word of every sentence and all proper names are capitalized. Special cases are:
 Respect expression – optional: Ty (you sg.), Tvůj (your sg.), Vy (you pl.), Váš (your pl.); Bůh (God), Mistr (Master), etc.
 Headings – The first word is capitalized.
 Cities, towns and villages – All words are capitalized, except for prepositions: Nové Město nad Metují (New-Town-upon-Metuje).
 Geographical or local names – The first word is capitalized, common names as ulice (street), náměstí (square) or moře (sea) are not capitalized: ulice Svornosti (Concordance Street), Václavské náměstí (Wenceslas Square), Severní moře (North Sea). Since 1993, the initial preposition and the first following word are capitalized: lékárna U Černého orla (Black Eagle Pharmacy).
 Official names of institutions – The first word is capitalized: Městský úřad v Kolíně (The Municipal Office in Kolín) vs. městský úřad (a municipal office). In some cases, a initial common name is not capitalized even if it is factually a part of the name: okres Semily (Semily District), náměstí Míru (Peace Square).
 Names of nations and nationality nouns are capitalized: Anglie (England), Angličan (Englishman), Německo (Germany), Němec (German). Adjectives derived from geographical names and names of nations, such as anglický (English – adjective) and pražský (Prague – adjective, e.g. pražské metro, Prague subway), are not. Names of languages are not capitalized: angličtina (English).
 Possessive adjectives derived from proper names are capitalized: Pavlův dům (Paul's house).
 Brands are capitalized as a trademark or company name, but usually not as product names: přijel trabant a několik škodovek but přijelo auto značky Trabant a několik aut značky Škoda, zákaz vjezdu segwayů but zákaz vjezdu vozítek Segway If a proper name contains other proper names, the inner proper names keep their orthography: Poslanecká sněmovna Parlamentu České republiky, Kostelec nad Černými lesy, Filozofická fakulta Jihočeské univerzity v Českých Budějovicích History 
In the 9th century, Glagolitic script was used, during the 11th century it was replaced by Latin script.
There are five periods in the development of the Czech Latin-based orthographic system:

Primitive orthography  For writing sounds which are foreign to the Latin alphabet, letters with similar sounds were used. The oldest known written notes in Czech originate from the 11th century. The literature was written predominantly in Latin in this period. Unfortunately, it was very ambiguous at times, with c, for example, being used for c, č, and k.

Digraphic orthography  Various digraphs were used for non-Latin sounds. The system was not consistent and it also did not distinguish long and short vowels. It had some features that Polish orthography has kept, such as cz, rz instead of č, ř, but was still crippled by ambiguities, such as spelling both s and š as s/ss, z and ž as z, and sometimes even c and č both as cz, only distinguishing by context. Long vowels such as á were sometimes (but not always) written double as aa. Other features of the day included spelling j as g and v as w, as the early modern Latin alphabet had not by then distinguished j from i or v from u.

Diacritic orthography  Introduced probably by Jan Hus. Using diacritics for long vowels ("virgula", an acute, "čárka" in Czech) and "soft" consonants ("punctus rotundus", a dot above a letter, which has survived in Polish ż) was suggested for the first time in "De orthographia Bohemica" around 1406. Diacritics replaced digraphs almost completely. It was also suggested that the Prague dialect should become the standard for Czech. Jan Hus is considered to be the author of that work but there is some uncertainty about this.

Brethren orthography  The Bible of Kralice (1579–1593), the first complete Czech translation of the Bible from the original languages by the Czech Brethren, became the model for the literary form of the language. The punctus rotundus was replaced by the caron ("háček"). There were some differences from the current orthography, e.g. the digraph ſſ was used instead of š; ay, ey, au instead of aj, ej, ou; v instead of u (at the beginning of words); w instead of v; g instead of j; and j instead of í ( = její, hers). Y was written always after c, s and z (e.g. cizí, foreign, was written cyzý) and the conjunction i (as well as, and) was written y''.

Modern orthography  During the period of the Czech National Renaissance (end of the 18th century and the first half of the 19th century), Czech linguists (Josef Dobrovský et al.) codified some reforms in the orthography. These principles have been effective up to the present day. The later reforms in the 20th century mostly referred to introducing loanwords into Czech and their adaptation to the Czech orthography.

Computer encoding
In computing, several different coding standards have existed for this alphabet, among them:
ISO 8859-2
Microsoft Windows code page 1250
IBM PC code page 852
Kamenický brothers or KEYBCS2 on early DOS PCs and on Fidonet.
Unicode

See also
Czech language
Czech phonology
Orthographia bohemica
Czech declension
Czech verb
Czech word order
International Phonetic Alphabet
Phonemic orthography
Háček
Kroužek
Non-English usage of quotation marks

References

External links
Czech Language
Czech Encodings FAQ and list of known encodings (in Czech)
Typo.cz Information on Central European typography and typesetting

Czech language
Indo-European Latin-script orthographies